Stone Grist Mill Complex is a historic grist mill complex located at St. Johnsville in Montgomery County, New York. The complex consists of the mill, the remains of a stone impoundment dam, the mill owner's house, bar, wagon shed, and hog house.  The mill was built about 1835 and is a 30 by 50 feet gable roofed structure constructed of rough cut, native limestone block laid in random ashlar.  The mill is now occupied by a bed and breakfast.

It was added to the National Register of Historic Places in 1996.

References

External links
Inn by the Mill: A Romantic Upscale Bed and Breakfast

Houses on the National Register of Historic Places in New York (state)
Federal architecture in New York (state)
Bed and breakfasts in New York (state)
Buildings and structures in Montgomery County, New York
Grinding mills in New York (state)
Houses in Montgomery County, New York
National Register of Historic Places in Montgomery County, New York
Grinding mills on the National Register of Historic Places in New York (state)